Arroio do Meio is a municipality in the state of Rio Grande do Sul, Brazil. It is 98 km from Porto Alegre. It is on the banks of the Taquari River.

The territory was little populated before the arrival of Europeans. Settlement in the territory began in 1853, principally by Germans and Portuguese. The territory used to be part of Lajeado and Encantado municipalities.

References

External links 
 History of the municipality
 Hymn of Arroio do Meio

Municipalities in Rio Grande do Sul